The 2010 Congressional election for Delegate to the United States House of Representatives from the United States Virgin Islands was held on November 2, 2010.

The non-voting delegate to the House of Representatives from the United States Virgin Islands is elected for two-year terms. The winner of the race served in the 112th Congress from January 3, 2011 until January 3, 2013.  The election was part of the 2010 U.S. House of Representatives election and coincided with other local elections in the Virgin Islands, including the 2010 gubernatorial race.

Election

Candidates
Incumbent U.S. Virgin Islands Delegate Donna Christian-Christensen, a Democrat, formally announced her campaign for re-election on Sunday, July 25, 2010. Christensen, who had held the seat since 1997, ran unopposed in 2008. In 2010, Christensen was challenged by Republican Vincent Emile Danet and two independent candidates – Guillaume Mimoun and Jeffrey Moorhead, a Saint Croix attorney.

Election results
Incumbent Del. Donna Christian-Christensen easily won re-election to another term, taking 18,584, or 71.2% of the total votes cast in the election. Independent candidate Jeffrey Moorhead placed second with 4,880 votes. Republican Vincent Danet came in third place with 2,223 votes, while independent candidate Guillaume Mimoun came in fourth place with 397 votes.

References

2010 United States Virgin Islands elections
Virgin Islands
2010